Mary Ann R. Dailey (born July 1, 1948) is a former Republican member of the Pennsylvania House of Representatives.

She attended Monessen High School and the Presbyterian University Hospital School of Nursing. She earned a B.S.N. from University of State of New York, a M.S.N. and Ph.D. from Widener University.

She was first elected to represent the 146th legislative district in the Pennsylvania House of Representatives in 1998, a position she held until her retirement prior to the 2004 election. From 2007 - 2013, she served as chair of the Nursing Department at Kutztown University of Pennsylvania. Currently, she is an Associate Professor of Nursing at Slippery Rock University, Slippery Rock, PA.

References

External links
 official PA House profile (archived)

1948 births
Living people
People from Monessen, Pennsylvania
Republican Party members of the Pennsylvania House of Representatives
Women state legislators in Pennsylvania